"Lost" (also released in Spanish as "Perdido Sin Ti") is a song by the Puerto Rican boy band, Menudo. It was released as a digital single with virtually no album support in June 2008. While it failed to enter the Billboard Hot 100, it instead charted on the Pop Songs chart at number 36.

Charts

References 

2008 singles
Menudo (band) songs
Songs written by Bruno Mars
Songs written by Cory Rooney
2008 songs
Epic Records singles